László von Magasházy (7 January 1879 – 5 October 1959) was a Hungarian equestrian. He competed in two events at the 1936 Summer Olympics.

References

External links
 

1879 births
1959 deaths
Hungarian male equestrians
Olympic equestrians of Hungary
Equestrians at the 1936 Summer Olympics
Sportspeople from Fejér County